Natalia Viktorovna Razumovskaya (born 18 August 1975) is a Russian freestyle skier. 

She won a gold medal at the FIS Freestyle World Ski Championships 1999 in Meiringen-Hasliberg.

References

External links 
 

1975 births
Living people
Russian female freestyle skiers